is a passenger railway station located in the city of Ōme, Tokyo, Japan, operated by the East Japan Railway Company (JR East).

Lines
Sawai Station is served by the Ōme Line, located 25.9 kilometers from the terminus of the line at Tachikawa Station.

Station layout
This station consists of a single island platform serving two tracks, connected to the station building by a footbridge. The station is unstaffed.

Platforms

History
The station opened on 1 September 1929. It was nationalized in April 1944. It became part of the East Japan Railway Company (JR East) with the breakup of the Japanese National Railways on 1 April 1987.

Passenger statistics
In fiscal 2010, the station was used by an average of 274 passengers daily (boarding passengers only).

Surrounding area
 
 Tama River

See also
 List of railway stations in Japan

References

External links 

 Sawai Station information page 

Railway stations in Tokyo
Ōme Line
Stations of East Japan Railway Company
Railway stations in Japan opened in 1929
Ōme, Tokyo